The 1968 Pacific Coast International Open was a combined men's and women's tennis tournament played on outdoor hard courts at the Berkeley Tennis Club in Berkeley, California in the United States. It was the 80th edition of the tournament, the first one in the Open Era, and ran from September 30 through October 6, 1968. Stan Smith and Margaret Court won the singles titles.

Finals

Men's singles
 Stan Smith defeated  Jim McManus 10–8, 6–1, 6–1

Women's singles
 Margaret Court defeated  Maria Bueno 6–4, 7–5

Men's doubles
 Bob Lutz /  Stan Smith defeated  Jim McManus /  Jim Osborne 10–8, 11–9

Women's doubles
 Maria Bueno /  Margaret Court defeated  Maryna Godwin /  Esmé Emmanuel 6–2, 6–4

Mixed's doubles
 Margaret Court /  Stan Smith defeated  Judy Tegart /  Jim McManus 8–10, 6–2, 6–2

References

1968
1968 in American tennis
1968 in sports in California